"Prom Queen" is a song recorded by American rock band Beach Bunny. The song was released on August 10, 2018.

Background
Trifilio wrote the track for a friend that was struggling with body issues. The song has been called "a protest of Euro-centric beauty standards." Trifilio was nervous to release the song, with it lacking a romantic theme that was commonplace for many of her songs: "I was scared it would be listened to in the wrong way, like I was encouraging eating disorders. In general, I think there’s a void (in pop music) in discussing social issues, and I hope to write more songs like that." The song is the namesake of the band's fourth extended play, first issued in August 2018.

"Prom Queen" is one of many songs that went viral on the Chinese video-sharing service TikTok, with hundreds of thousands of user-generated videos featuring the song as its soundtrack. Abby Jones at Pitchfork described many of these clips as featuring "a girl posing in front of a phone camera to illustrate Trifilio's opening lines: 'Shut up, count your calories/I never looked good in mom jeans.'" The song first went viral in April 2019, months after its release.

Reception
Greg Kot from the Chicago Tribune said the track "distills tween anxiety and self-doubt with a rare directness. It’s a survivor’s manual dressed up in dark wit and a sharp, guitar-driven melody." Jones from Pitchfork called it indicative of the band's formula: "sentimental and wistful, with a plainspokenness that prompts immediate sympathy." Paper Eli Enis said the song "radiates a sense of emotional victory, as if Trifilio has expelled the unpleasant subject matter and is now singing from a place of resilience."

Personnel
Credits adapted from the group's Bandcamp.
Beach Bunny
 Lili Trifilio - vocals, guitar, songwriting
 Jonathan Alvarado - drums
 Matt Henkels - lead guitar
 Aidan Cada – bass guitar

Production
 Ray Riot – recording engineer
 Nick Reuille – assistant recording engineer
 Aaron Cada – mixing, mastering

Charts

Certifications

References

2018 singles
2018 songs
Beach Bunny (band) songs